Ferdi Tyteca (born 27 December 1954) is a Belgian former equestrian. He competed in two events at the 1984 Summer Olympics.

References

External links
 

1954 births
Living people
Belgian male equestrians
Olympic equestrians of Belgium
Equestrians at the 1984 Summer Olympics
People from Beveren
Sportspeople from East Flanders